Upper Harbour is a parliamentary electorate in Auckland that returns one member to the New Zealand House of Representatives. The seat is currently held by Labour's Vanushi Walters, who won the seat in the 2020 election.

Geography
Upper Harbour covers the northwestern reaches of Waitematā Harbour. It stretches from Massey, in West Auckland, through West Harbour and Hobsonville, and across to Greenhithe and on to Glenfield and Unsworth Heights on the North Shore.

History
Upper Harbour was proposed in the 2013/14 electorate boundary review and confirmed by the Electoral Commission on 17 April 2014. The 2013 census showed that the Auckland region had seen faster population growth than other areas, so needed an extra electorate to keep all electorates within five percent of their quota. A small portion of the electorate around Tihema Stream was moved to the new electorate of Kaipara ki Mahurangi in the 2020 redistribution.

When the draft changes to electorate boundaries were first announced, the incumbent of the Waitakere electorate, Paula Bennett, was quick to announce that she would stand in Upper Harbour instead. This was to prevent Colin Craig of the Conservative Party making a claim for the electorate, as at the time, there was speculation whether the National Party would make a deal with the Conservatives for a safe seat in line with the agreement with ACT New Zealand in the  electorate. Bennett won the 2014 election with a majority of nearly 10,000 votes over Labour's Hermann Retzlaff.

At the  Bennett retired and Labour's Vanushi Walters won the seat against National’s Jake Bezzant. This was one of fifteen electorates that Labour took from National in an election that dramatically changed the composition of New Zealand’s parliament.

Members of Parliament
Unless otherwise stated, all MPs' terms began and ended at general elections.

Key

List MPs
Members of Parliament elected from party lists in elections where that person also unsuccessfully contested the Upper Harbour electorate. Unless otherwise stated, all MPs' terms began and ended at general elections.

Key

Election results

2020 election

2017 election

2014 election

Notes

References

External links
Upper Harbour electorate profile, New Zealand Parliament

New Zealand electorates in the Auckland Region
2014 establishments in New Zealand